Tulkunbay Turgunov (born February 6, 1977) is a boxer from Uzbekistan.

He participated in the 2000 Summer Olympics for his native Central Asian country. There he was stopped in the second round of the Featherweight (57 kg) division by Thailand's Somluck Kamsing, the reigning Olympic champion.

Turgunov won the silver medal in the same division one year earlier, at the 1999 World Amateur Boxing Championships in Houston, Texas.

References
 Profile

1977 births
Featherweight boxers
Boxers at the 2000 Summer Olympics
Olympic boxers of Uzbekistan
Living people
People from Andijan Region
Asian Games medalists in boxing
Boxers at the 1998 Asian Games
Uzbekistani male boxers
AIBA World Boxing Championships medalists
Asian Games silver medalists for Uzbekistan
Medalists at the 1998 Asian Games
20th-century Uzbekistani people